Simon Lehoko (born in 1951) is a retired South African football (soccer) player. He played for Kaizer Chiefs and Vaal Professionals F.C.

Early life
As a teenager growing up in Sedibeng he played for his father Shadrack Lehoko's team Real X20 which was based in Sharpeville. By the age of 16 he established himself as one of the best defenders in the Vaal. He was regularly selected in the Sharpeville Invitational XI which played against Moroka Swallows, Orlando Pirates and Kaizer Chiefs on numerous occasions. His brother, Joseph Lehoko nicknamed him "Bull" for his defensive style, which stuck with him till today.

Education
He attended Lekoa Shandu and enrolled at the Wilberforce Training College to get a teacher's diploma. At the training college he met former Kaizer Chiefs midfielder Ariel Kgongoane. After qualifying to be a teacher he moved from Sharpeville to Meadowlands Zone 5 and taught in Dobsonville.

Kaizer Chiefs
After his great performances at Vaal he was signed by Chiefs in 1978. He was captained by Ryder Mofokeng until his retirement in 1985. He was part of the team that won the quadruple in 1981.

International
Lehoko represented South Africa in 1977 versus Rhodesia.

Retirement
He retired at the age of 34 after a nagging knee injury.

After retirement
He coaching his former club to 1994 Bob Save Super Bowl victory (now Nedbank Cup). He runs the Simon Bull Lehoko Foundation with his son, Mojekisane Lehoko.

References

1951 births
Living people
People from Vereeniging
Association football defenders
South African soccer players
South Africa international soccer players
Kaizer Chiefs F.C. players
Sportspeople from Gauteng